Jervis Bay National Park, formerly known as Jervis Bay National Park (NSW), consists of several protected areas on the western and northern foreshores of Jervis Bay, on the south coast of New South Wales. The park is close to the town of Huskisson and includes Hyams Beach, renowned for its white sand, whale watching and fishing opportunities.

Visitor facilities are provided in the Greenfield Beach section of the park, including toilets, showers and walking tracks.

The park was gazetted in 1995 as "Jervis Bay National Park (NSW)" to avoid confusion with nearby Booderee National Park in the Jervis Bay Territory, then known by the same name. Part of Jervis Bay itself is reserved as Jervis Bay Marine Park.

The Aboriginal heritage in the park dates back thousands of years and they still feel a strong connection to the land.

Jervis Bay National Park is 48.57 km2 in size and is managed by the New South Wales Department of Environment and Climate Change.

The average altitude of the terrain is 16 metres.

Gallery

References

External links
 Jervis Bay National Park official webpage
 Shoalhaven region tourism site 

National parks of New South Wales
1995 establishments in Australia
Jervis Bay Territory